Somethingroyal (March 12, 1952 – June 9, 1983) was an American Thoroughbred racehorse best known as the dam of the 1973 U.S. Triple Crown champion and Hall of Fame inductee Secretariat. She also produced three other stakes winners and was named the 1973 Kentucky Broodmare of the Year.

Background
Somethingroyal was bred in Virginia by her owner Christopher Chenery's Meadow Stud. Her sire was Princequillo, an Irish-bred horse who originally had a reputation as a "plodder" because his major victories came in long distance races. Princequillo soon proved himself an outstanding sire, known for transmitting his stamina. Somethingroyal's dam Imperatrice was a stakes winning mare who was bought by Chenery at a dispersal sale in 1947 for $30,000. Imperatrice was the dam of six stakes winners but is now best known for producing Somethingroyal, who raced only once, finishing unplaced.

Broodmare career
Somethingroyal was named the 1973 Kentucky Broodmare of the Year when at age 18 she became the oldest mare to foal an American Triple Crown winner, Secretariat. She had already established herself as a "blue hen", having produced several stakes-winning and stakes-placed horses. Her most important foals included:
 Cherryville (foaled in 1958) – sired by Correspondent. Was stakes-placed and became a successful producer 
 Sir Gaylord (1959) – by Turn-To. Won six stakes races and later became an excellent sire, whose offspring include Sir Ivor
 Mostar (1961) – by Double Jay. Stakes-placed
 First Family (1962) – by First Landing. Stakes winner
 Swansea (1963) – by Turn-to. Winless but became a successful producer 
 Grand Coulee (1964) – by First Landing. Stakes-placed and producer
 Syrian Sea (1965) – by Bold Ruler. Multiple stakes winner and successful producer 
 The Bride (1969) – by Bold Ruler. Winless but became a successful producer 
 Secretariat (1970) – by Bold Ruler. Triple Crown winner, Hall of Fame inductee, good sire and leading broodmare sire
 Somethingfabulous (1972) – by Northern Dancer. Grade I-placed and good regional sire
 Straight Flush (1975) - by Riva Ridge. Race winner and sire.
 Queen's Colours (1976) – by Reviewer. Winless but became a successful producer

Somethingroyal produced 18 named foals, 15 of which started and 11 of which won. She was pensioned from broodmare duty in 1978 and died in 1983 at the age of 31.

As both Secretariat and Sir Gaylord were successful sires, inbreeding to Somethingroyal became fairly common in later generations. Weekend Surprise, the 1992 Kentucky Broodmare of the Year and dam of leading sire A.P. Indy, is an example of such inbreeding. Somethingroyal is one of the key influences tracked by the Rasmussen Factor, a Thoroughbred breeding theory that measures inbreeding to superior producers.

Pedigree

References

 Pedigree and stats
http://www.secretariat.com/spotlight/secretariats-brother/

1952 racehorse births
1983 racehorse deaths
Racehorses bred in Virginia
Racehorses trained in the United States
Kentucky Broodmare of the Year
Thoroughbred family 2-s
Blue Hen Broodmare